Mayer may refer to:
Mayer (name)

Places 
 C. Mayer (crater), named after Christian Mayer
 Mayer, Syria
 Mayer, Arizona, United States
 Mayer, Minnesota, United States
 Mayersville, Mississippi, United States
 Mayerthorpe, Alberta, Canada
 T. Mayer (crater), named after Tobias Mayer

Companies
 Mayer Brown, an international law firm
 Metro-Goldwyn-Mayer, a motion picture production company
 Mayer Hoffman McCann P.C., a U.S. CPA firm
 Mayers Murray & Phillip, an architectural firm
 Oscar Mayer, a meat company
 Victor Mayer, a German jewelry manufacturer

Other 
 Mayer Authority, European consortium (1955–1958) led by René Mayer
 Mayer expansion
 Mayer's Relation
 Mayer f-function
 Mayer-Norton theorem
 Mayer-Vietoris sequence

See also
 Maya (disambiguation)
 Mayor (disambiguation)
 Meyer (disambiguation)
 Meir (disambiguation)
 Myer (disambiguation)